Ajay Kumar (born 31 August 1976), popularly known as Guinness Pakru, is an Indian actor. He has made an entry into the Guinness World Records for being the shortest actor to play a character in a full-length film. He played the lead role in Athbhutha Dweepu, a Malayalam movie directed by Vinayan. The movie was later dubbed in Tamil and Telugu versions.

The film Athbhutha Dweepu starred him as dwarf prince Gajendra of the kingdom Vamanapuri on a fantasy island, where the men were cursed to be dwarfs and women were of normal height. Around 300 dwarves acted in that film. In 2013, Pakru made his directorial debut with the film Kutteem Kolum.

Early life

He was born Ajay Kumar, as the eldest son, of Radhakrishna Pillai and Ambujakshiyamma, on 31 August 1976 at his father's home in Mulavana, Kundara. His father was an auto driver and mother was an L.I.C agent who also worked at a telephone service agency on contract. Soon after his birth his family moved to Kottayam. Since his mother was often transferred they moved from one place to other and finally settled at Pandavam, Aymanam, Kerala. He has two younger sisters, Kavitha and Sangeetha. 

He studied at C.M.S L.P School, Chalukunnu until fourth grade and at C.M.S High School, Olassa until S.S.L.C. Then he joined Baselius College, Kottayam and completed his pre degree and graduation from there. He is a BA graduate in economics and has a diploma in computer science. 

He started his career as a mimicry artist and later moved to films. He worked as a mimicry artist in mimicry troupes like Mangalam Mimics, Nadirsha's Cochin Universal and Kottayam Nazeer's Cochin Discovery. By age 18 he had completed 1000 mimicry stages. 

He debuted through the children's film Ambili Ammavan (The Moon) in 1984. He now also acts in TV serials.

Personal life

Pakru married Gayathri Mohan in March 2006. They have a daughter, Deeptha Keerthi, born on 14 April 2009. Pakru once said that Deeptha Keerthi was actually his second daughter. Before her, there was a daughter who lived only for two weeks.

Transformation to director

Pakru became a director with the 2013 Malayalam movie Kutteem Kolum, in which he also played the lead role in the movie. He may be the shortest director in filmdom. The film starred Aditya, Sanusha, Laya, Munna, Suraj Venjaramoodu, Vijayaraghavan and Ponnamma Babu. The camera was handled by Vinod Bharathi and music by Shaan Rahman.

Honours and awards

Pakru made an entry into the Guinness World Records for being the shortest lead actor (2 ft 6 in (76 cm)) to play a character in a full-length film. His accomplishment is cited on the 167th page of the 2008 edition of the Guinness World Records. He was also presented with a Kerala State Film Award best supporting actor Tamil Nadu State Film Awards for his performance in the film Dishyum in 2006.

Guinness World Records
 Guinness Book of Records (2008 edition) - shortest actor to play a lead character in a full-length movie
 Guinness Book of Records (2013 edition) - shortest film director in the world to direct a full-length movie

Kerala State Film Awards
 Kerala State Film Award – Special Mention (2006) - Athbhutha Dweepu

Tamil Nadu State Film Awards
 Tamil Nadu State Film Award Special Prize (2006) - Dishyum
Movie Street Film Awards (2020)-Best Actor- Special Jury(Ilayaraja)

Filmography

As actor
Malayalam

 Ambili Ammavan (1986)....as Undapakru
 Ithaa Samayamaayi (1987)
 Antharjanam (1989)....Pakru
 Joker (2000)....as Joker
 Basket (2002)
 Kunjikoonan (2002)....as Suhasini
 Meesha Madhavan (2002)
 Malsaram (2003)....as Induchoodan
 Athbhutha Dweepu (2005)....as Prince Gajendran (Kerala State Film Award (Special Jury Award) in 2005)
 Manikyan (2005)....as Watchman
 Kilukkam Kilukilukkam (2006)
 Athisayan (2007)
 Mulla (2008)....Chandran
 Twenty:20 (2008)....as a worker in Tea shop
 Ee Pattanathil Bhootham (2009)....as Balan
 Sivapuram (2009)
 Puthiya Mukham (2009)
 Loudspeaker (2009)....as an agent
 Bodyguard (2010)....as Kudamaloor Balaji
 My Big Father (2010)....as Kunjumon
 Swantham Bharya Zindabad (2010)....as Vettoor Sivankutty
 Note Out (2011)
 Payyans (2011)
 Venicile Vyapari (2011)....as Kochukrishnan
 Rathinirvedam (2011)
 Killadi Raman (2011)....as Bada Bhai
 Snake & Ladder (2012)
 Perinoru Makan (2012)....as Murugan
 My Fan Ramu (2013)
 Housefull (2013)....as Dr. Shenayi
 Kutteem Kolum (2013)....as Vinayakan
 Immanuel (2013)....as Kannadi Kavi Shivan
 Abhiyum Njanum (2013)....as Veerabhadran
 Ring Master (2014)....as Achankunju
 6 (2015).....as Vedalam
 3 Wicketinu 365 Runs (2015)
 Punyalan Private Limited (2017)....as Bank Manager
 Ilayaraja (2019)
Fancy Dress (2019)
 Mr. Pavanayi 99.99 (2019)
Veerapakru (2020)

Tamil
 Dishyum (2006) ....as Amitabh (Tamil Nadu State Film Award (Special Prizes))
 Arputha Theevu (2007)....as Kajendran
 Thalai Ezhuthu (2009).... as Kirthik
 Kaavalan (2011)
 7aum Arivu (2011)
 Ariyaan (2012)
 Bagheera (2023)....as Pakru

As director
 Kuttiyum Kolum (2013)

As producer
Fancy Dress''' (2019)

Television
Serials
 Savari Girigiri (Surya TV)Tom and Jerry (Asianet)
 Vallabhan C/O Vallabhan Cinemala (Asianet)
 Five Star Thattukada (Asianet)Ente Maathavu (Surya TV)Erivum Puliyum  (Zee Keralam)
Shows
 Chirikum Pattanam (Kairali TV)
 Comedy Festival (Mazhavil Manorama)
 Pokeeri Peekiri (Asianet Plus)
 Kuttykalavara (Flowers TV)
 Komedy Circus (Mazhavil Manorama)
 Comedy Utsavam (Flowers)
 Thakarppan Comedy (Mazhavil Manorama)Midumidukki'' (Flowers TV channel)
Top Singer (Flowers TV)
Music Ulsavam (Flowers TV)
Comedy masters (Amrita TV)
Comedy Utsavam 3 (Flowers TV)

References

External links
 

1976 births
20th-century Indian male actors
21st-century Indian male actors
Living people
Actors with dwarfism
Male actors from Kottayam
Male actors in Malayalam cinema
Male actors in Malayalam television
Male actors in Tamil cinema
Indian male film actors
Indian male television actors
Kerala State Film Award winners